Prince Andrzej Poniatowski (16 July 1734/5 – Vienna, 3/5 March 1773) was a Polish nobleman (Szlachcic), General and Field Marshal.

Andrzej was a son of Count Stanisław Poniatowski, Castellan of Kraków, and Princess Konstancja Czartoryska, the brother of King Stanisław August Poniatowski of Poland and the father of Józef Antoni Poniatowski.

He became Starost of Pieńsk (starost prenski), Lieutenant-General in 1760 and Field Marshal in 1771 both in Austrian service and disguised himself during the Seven Years' War. In 1764 he came back to Poland and supported his brother in the royal elections in Poland. The Coronation Sejm awarded him the Polish title of Prince on 4 December 1764, Empress Maria Theresa on 10 December 1765 the Bohemian title of Prince, and Emperor Joseph II the Austrian title of Prince. He was also starost prenski.

He married on 3 May 1761 Maria Theresia Gräfin Kinsky von Wchinitz und Tettau (14 February 1736/1740 - 25 September 1806), daughter of Leopold-Ferdinand Graf Kinsky von Wchinitz und Tettau (Chlumec nad Cidlinou (Chlumetz), 17 January 1713 – 24 October 1760) and wife (married in Vienna, 6 September 1734) Maria Teresa Capece dei Marchesi di Rofrano (3 June 1715 – 12 November 1778) by whom he had a daughter, Maria Teresa (baptized on 28 November 1760 – Tours, 2 November 1834), married in 1778 Count Wincenty Tyszkiewicz (? - 1816), referendarz wielki litewski, and a son, Józef Antoni Poniatowski.

Awards
 : Knight of the Military Order of Maria Theresa, 7 March 1758
 :
 Knight of the Order of St. Stanislaus, 1765
 Knight of the Order of the White Eagle, 1766
  Kingdom of France: Knight of the Order of St. Michael

References

Bibliography
 Emanuel Rostworowski, „Poniatowski Andrzej”, w: Polski Słownik Biograficzny, XXVII, Wrocław 1983, s. 412-420.
 Henryk P. Kosk, Polscy generałowie w służbie obcej, Polska Zbrojna.
 Historia Dyplomacji Polskiej – tom II 1572-1795, PWN Warszawa 1981, s. 548.

1735 births
1773 deaths
Field marshals of Austria
Ambassadors of Poland to Austria
Diplomats of the Polish–Lithuanian Commonwealth
18th-century Polish–Lithuanian military personnel
Polish generals in other armies
Andrzej
Knights Cross of the Military Order of Maria Theresa
Recipients of the Order of the White Eagle (Poland)